RKK may refer to:
Rooms-Katholiek Kerkgenootschap, a broadcaster in the Netherlands
S.P. Korolev Rocket and Space Corporation Energia, also known as RKK Energiya, a Russian manufacturer of spacecraft and space station components
Reichskulturkammer
Risshō Kōsei Kai, a Japanese movement with an emphasis on the Lotus Sutra
Runda Kumpulan Kecil, an insurgent group in Southern Thailand
Robert Kenneth Kraft, American businessman
Kumamoto Broadcasting, a Radio and TV Station in Kumamoto, Japan